This article is part of the history of rail transport by country series.

Wooden railroads, called wagonways, were built in the United States starting from the 1720s. A railroad was reportedly used in the construction of the French fortress at Louisburg, Nova Scotia, in New France (now Canada) in 1720. Between 1762 and 1764, at the close of the French and Indian War (1756–1763), a gravity railroad (mechanized tramway) called Montresor's Tramway was built by British military engineers up the steep riverside terrain near the Niagara River waterfall's escarpment at the Niagara Portage  (which the local Senecas called "Crawl on All Fours.") in Lewiston, New York.

Railroads played a large role in the development of the United States from the industrial revolution in the Northeast (1810–1850) to the settlement of the West (1850–1890). The American railroad mania began with the founding of the first passenger and freight line in the nation of the Baltimore and Ohio Railroad in 1827 and the "Laying of the First Stone" ceremonies and beginning of its long construction heading westward over the obstacles of the Appalachian Mountains eastern chain the following year of 1828, and flourished with continuous railway building projects for the next 45 years until the financial  Panic of 1873 followed by a major economic depression bankrupted many companies and temporarily stymied and ended growth.

Although the antebellum South started early to build railways, it concentrated on short lines linking cotton regions to oceanic or river ports, and the absence of an interconnected network was a major handicap during the Civil War (1861–1865). The North and Midwest constructed networks that linked every city by 1860 before the war. In the heavily settled Midwestern Corn Belt, over 80 percent of farms were within  of a railway, facilitating the shipment of grain, hogs, and cattle to national and international markets. A large number of short lines were built, but due to a fast developing financial system based on Wall Street and oriented to railway bonds, the majority were consolidated into 20 trunk lines by 1890. State and local governments often subsidized lines, but rarely owned them.

The system was largely built by 1910, but then trucks arrived to eat away the freight traffic, and automobiles (and later airplanes) to devour the passenger traffic. After 1940, the use of diesel electric locomotives made for much more efficient operations that needed fewer workers on the road and in repair shops.

A series of bankruptcies and consolidations left the rail system in the hands of a few large operations by the 1980s. Almost all long-distance passenger traffic was shifted to Amtrak in 1971, a government-owned operation. Commuter rail service is provided near a few major cities, including New York City, Chicago, Boston, Philadelphia, Baltimore, and Washington, D.C. Computerization and improved equipment steadily reduced employment, which peaked at 2.1 million in 1920, falling to 1.2 million in 1950 and 215,000 in 2010.

Freight railroads continue to play an important role in the United States' economy, especially for moving imports and exports using containers, and for shipments of coal and, since 2010, of oil. According to the British news magazine The Economist, "They are universally recognized in the industry as the best in the world."   Productivity rose 172% between 1981 and 2000, while rates rose 55% (after accounting for inflation). Rail's share of the American freight market rose to 43%, the highest for any rich country.

Chronological history

Early period (1720–1825)

A railroad was reportedly used in the construction of the French fortress at Louisburg, Nova Scotia, in 1720. Between 1762 and 1764, at the close of the French and Indian War, a gravity railroad (mechanized tramway) (Montresor's Tramway) is built by British military engineers up the steep riverside terrain near the Niagara River waterfall's escarpment at the Niagara Portage  (which the local Senecas called "Crawl on All Fours.") in Lewiston, New York.<ref
 name=PMat-text></ref>

Early period (1826–1860)

The animal powered Leiper Railroad followed in 1810 after the preceding successful experiment—designed and built by merchant Thomas Leiper, the railway connected Crum Creek to Ridley Creek, in Delaware County, Pennsylvania. It was used until 1829, when it was temporarily replaced by the Leiper Canal, then it was reopened to replace the canal in 1852. This became the Crum Creek Branch of the Baltimore and Philadelphia Railroad (part of the Baltimore and Ohio Railroad) in 1887. This was the first railroad meant to be permanent, and the first to evolve into trackage of a common carrier after an intervening closure.

In 1826 Massachusetts incorporated Quincy's Granite Railway as a common freight carrier to primarily haul granite for the construction of the Bunker Hill Monument; operations began later that year, and which still had a section of it operating until the 1940s.

Other railroads authorized by states in 1826 and constructed in the following years included the Delaware and Hudson Canal Company's gravity railroad; and the Mohawk and Hudson Railroad, to carry freight and passengers around a bend in the Erie Canal. To link the port of Baltimore to the Ohio River, the state of Maryland in 1827 chartered the Baltimore and Ohio Railroad (B&O), the first section of which opened in 1830. Similarly, the South Carolina Canal and Railroad Company was chartered in 1827 to connect Charleston to the Savannah River, and Pennsylvania built the Main Line of Public Works between Philadelphia and the Ohio River.

The Americans closely followed and copied British railroad technology. The Baltimore and Ohio Railroad was the first common carrier and started passenger train service in May 1830, initially using horses to pull train cars.  The South Carolina Canal and Rail Road Company was the first to use steam locomotives regularly beginning with the Best Friend of Charleston, the first American-built locomotive intended for revenue service, in December 1830.

The B&O started developing steam locomotives in 1829 with Peter Cooper's Tom Thumb. This was the first American-built locomotive to run in the U.S., although it was intended as a demonstration of the potential of steam traction rather than as a revenue-earning locomotive. Many of the earliest locomotives for American railroads were imported from England, including the Stourbridge Lion and the John Bull, but a domestic locomotive manufacturing industry was quickly established, with locomotives like the DeWitt Clinton being built in the 1830s. The B&O's westward route reached the Ohio River in 1852, the first eastern seaboard railroad to do so.

By 1850,  of railroad lines had been built. The federal government operated a land grant system between 1855 and 1871, through which new railway companies in the west were given millions of acres they could sell or pledge to bondholders. This program enabled the opening of numerous western lines, especially the Union Pacific-Central Pacific with fast service from San Francisco to Omaha and east to Chicago. West of Chicago, many cities grew up as rail centers, with repair shops and a base of technically literate workers.

Railroads soon replaced many canals and turnpikes and by the 1870s had significantly displaced steamboats as well. The railroads were superior to these alternative modes of transportation, particularly water routes because they lowered costs in two ways. Canals and rivers were unavailable in the winter season due to freezing, but the railroads ran year-round despite poor weather. And railroads were safer: the likelihood of a train crash was less than the likelihood of a boat sinking. The railroads provided cost-effective transportation because they allowed shippers to have a smaller inventory of goods, which reduced storage costs during winter, and to avoid insurance costs from the risk of losing goods during transit.

Likewise, railroads changed the style of transportation. For the common person in the early 1800s, transportation was often traveled by horse or stagecoach. The network of trails along which coaches navigated were riddled with ditches, potholes, and stones. This made travel fairly uncomfortable. Adding to injury, coaches were cramped with little leg room. Travel by train offered a new style. Locomotives proved themselves a smooth, headache free ride with plenty of room to move around. Some passenger trains offered meals in the spacious dining car followed by a good night sleep in the private sleeping quarters. Railroad companies in the North and Midwest constructed networks that linked nearly every major city by 1860. In the heavily settled Corn Belt (from Ohio to Iowa), over 80 percent of farms were within  of a railway.  A large number of short lines were built, but due to a fast developing financial system based on Wall Street and oriented to railway securities, the majority were consolidated into 20 trunk lines by 1890. Most of these railroads made money and ones that didn't were soon bought up and incorporated in a larger system or "rationalized". Although the transcontinental railroads dominated the media, with the completion of the First transcontinental railroad in 1869 dramatically symbolizing the nation's unification after the divisiveness of the Civil War, most construction actually took place in the industrial Northeast and agricultural Midwest, and was designed to minimize shipping times and costs. The railroads in the South were repaired and expanded and then, after a lot of preparation, changed from a 5-foot gauge to standard gauge of 4 foot 8 ½ inches in two days in May 1886.

With its extensive river system, the United States supported a large array of horse-drawn or mule-drawn barges on canals and paddle wheel steamboats on rivers that competed with railroads after 1815 until the 1870s.  The canals and steamboats lost out because of the dramatic increases in efficiency and speed of the railroads, which could go almost anywhere year round. The railroads were faster and went to many places a canal would be impractical or too expensive to build or a natural river never went. Railroads also had better scheduling since they often could go year round, more or less ignoring the weather. Canals and river traffic were cheaper if you lived on or near a canal or river that wasn't frozen over part of the year, but only a few did. Long-distance transport of goods by wagon to a canal or river was slow and expensive. A railroad to a city made it an inland "port" that often prospered or turned a town into a city.

Civil War and Reconstruction (1861–1877)

Rail was strategic during the American Civil War, and the Union used its much larger system much more effectively. Practically all the mills and factories supplying rails and equipment were in the North, and the Union blockade kept the South from getting new equipment or spare parts. The war was fought in the South, and Union raiders (and sometimes Confederates too) systematically destroyed bridges and rolling stock — and sometimes bent rails — to hinder the logistics of the enemy.

In the South, most railroads in 1860 were local affairs connecting cotton regions with the nearest waterway. Most transports were by boat, not rail, and after the Union blockaded the ports in 1861 and seized the key rivers in 1862, long-distance travel was difficult. The outbreak of war had a depressing effect on the economic fortunes of the railroad companies, for the hoarding of the cotton crop in an attempt to force European intervention left railroads bereft of their main source of income. Many had to lay off employees, and in particular, let go skilled technicians and engineers. For the early years of the war, the Confederate government had a hands-off approach to the railroads. Only in mid-1863 did the Confederate government initiate an overall policy, and it was confined solely to aiding the war effort. With the legislation of impressment the same year, railroads and their rolling stock came under the de facto control of the Confederate military.

Conditions deteriorated rapidly in the Confederacy, as there was no new equipment and raids on both sides systematically destroyed key bridges, as well as locomotives and freight cars. Spare parts were cannibalized; feeder lines were torn up to get replacement rails for trunk lines, and the heavy use of rolling stock wore them out. In 1864–65 the Confederate railroad network collapsed; little traffic moved in 1865.

The Southern states had blocked westward rail expansion before 1860, but after secession the Pacific Railway Acts were passed in 1862 and 1863, which respectively established the central Pacific route and the standard gauge to be used.  With federal financing in the form of bonds and generous land grants and with the heroic help of the mainly Chinese and Irish laborers, Central Pacific Railroad working eastward and Union Pacific Railroad working westward combined to complete in 1869 the major breakthrough First transcontinental railroad, which linked by rail the eastern states with the Pacific coast and made possible moving from New York to San Francisco Bay in only six days. In addition, other transcontinentals were built in the South (Southern Pacific, Santa Fe) and in the North along the Canada–US border (Northern Pacific, Great Northern), accelerating the settlement of the West by offering inexpensive farms and ranches on credit, carrying pioneers and supplies westward, and cattle, wheat and minerals eastward. In 1860 before the transcontinentals, railroads carried less than half as much freight as inland waterways, whereas by 1890 railroads carried five times as much freight as waterways.

During the Reconstruction era, Northern money financed the rebuilding and dramatic expansion of railroads throughout the South; they were modernized in terms of track gauge, equipment and standards of service. The Southern network expanded from 11,000 miles (17,700 km) in 1870 to 29,000 miles (46,700 km) in 1890. The lines were owned and directed overwhelmingly by Northerners. Railroads helped create a mechanically skilled group of craftsmen and broke the isolation of much of the region. Passengers were few, however, and apart from hauling the cotton crop when it was harvested, there was little freight traffic.

The Panic of 1873 was a major global economic depression which ended rapid rail expansion in the United States. Many lines went bankrupt or were barely able to pay the interest on their bonds, and workers were laid off on a mass scale, with those still employed subject to large cuts in wages. This worsening situation for railroad workers led to strikes against many railroads, culminating in the Great Railroad Strike of 1877.

The Great Strike began on July 14 in Martinsburg, West Virginia, in response to the cutting of wages for the second time in a year by the B&O Railroad. The strike, and related violence, spread to Cumberland, Maryland, Baltimore, Pittsburgh, Buffalo, Philadelphia, Chicago and the Midwest. The strike lasted for 45 days, and ended only with the intervention of local and state militias, and federal troops. Labor unrest continued into the 1880s, such as the Great Southwest Railroad Strike of 1886, which involved over 200,000 workers.

Expansion and consolidation (1878–1916)

By 1880 the nation had 17,800 freight locomotives carrying 23,600 tons of freight, and 22,200 passenger locomotives. The U.S. railroad industry was the nation's largest employer outside of the agricultural sector. The effects of the American railways on rapid industrial growth were many, including the opening of hundreds of millions of acres of very good farm land ready for mechanization, lower costs for food and all goods, a huge national sales market, the creation of a culture of engineering excellence, and the creation of the modern system of management.

New York financier J.P. Morgan played an increasingly dominant role in consolidating the rail system in the late 19th century. He orchestrated reorganizations and consolidations in all parts of the United States. Morgan raised large sums in Europe, but instead of only handling the funds, he helped the railroads reorganize and achieve greater efficiencies. He fought against the speculators interested in speculative profits, and built a vision of an integrated transportation system. In 1885, he reorganized the New York, West Shore & Buffalo Railroad, leasing it to the New York Central. In 1886, he reorganized the Philadelphia & Reading, and in 1888 the Chesapeake & Ohio. He was heavily involved with railroad tycoon James J. Hill and the Great Northern Railway.

Industrialists such as Morgan, Cornelius Vanderbilt and Jay Gould became wealthy through railroad ownerships, as large railroad companies such as the Grand Trunk Railway and the Southern Pacific Transportation Company spanned several states. In response to monopolistic practices and other excesses of some railroads and their owners, Congress passed the Interstate Commerce Act and created the Interstate Commerce Commission (ICC) in 1887. The ICC indirectly controlled the business activities of the railroads through the issuance of extensive regulations.

Morgan set up conferences in 1889 and 1890 that brought together railroad presidents in order to help the industry follow the new laws and write agreements for the maintenance of "public, reasonable, uniform and stable rates." The conferences were the first of their kind, and by creating a community of interest among competing lines paved the way for the great consolidations of the early 20th century. Congress responded by enacting antitrust legislation to prohibit monopolies of railroads (and other industries), beginning with the Sherman Antitrust Act in 1890.

The Panic of 1893 was the largest economic depression in U.S. history at that time. It was the result of railroad overbuilding and shaky railroad financing, which set off a series of bank failures. The failed lines included the Northern Pacific Railway, the Union Pacific Railroad and the Atchison, Topeka & Santa Fe Railroad. Acquisitions of the bankrupt companies led to further consolidation of ownership. As of 1906, two-thirds of the rail mileage in the U.S. was controlled by seven entities, with the New York Central, Pennsylvania Railroad (PRR), and Morgan having the largest portions.

James J. Hill joined forces with Morgan and others to gain control of the Northern Pacific. Hill formed the Northern Securities Company to consolidate the operations of the Northern Pacific with Hill's own Great Northern, but President Theodore Roosevelt, a trust-buster, strongly disapproved and took it to court. In 1904 the federal courts dissolved the Northern Security company (see Northern Securities Co. v. United States) and the railroads had to go their separate, competitive ways. By that time Morgan and Hill had ensured the Northern Pacific was well-organized and able to survive easily on its own.

In 1901 the Union Pacific Railroad acquired all of the stock of the Southern Pacific. The federal government charged UP with violating the Sherman Act, and in 1913 the Supreme Court ordered UP to divest itself of all SP stock. This ruling was received with considerable alarm throughout the industry, as UP and SP were widely considered at that time not to be significant competitors. (Later in the 20th century, with different economic conditions and changes in the law, UP successfully acquired the SP. See Resurgence of freight railroads in the 1980s.)

Continuing concern over rate discrimination by railroads led Congress to enact additional laws, giving increased regulatory powers to the ICC. The 1906 Hepburn Act gave the ICC authority to set maximum rates and review the companies' financial records.

Nationalized management (1917–1920)
The United States Railroad Administration (USRA) temporarily took over management of railroads during World War I to address inadequacy in critical facilities throughout the overall system, such as terminals, trackage, and rolling stock. President Woodrow Wilson issued an order for nationalization on December 26, 1917. Management by USRA led to standardization of equipment, reductions of duplicative passenger services, and better coordination of freight traffic. Federal control of the railroads ended in March 1920 under the Esch–Cummins Act.

Railroads in the early automobile/trucking era (1921–1945)
Following the war, some members of Congress, the ICC, and some railroad executives developed concerns about inefficiencies in the American railroad system. Memories of the 1893 panic, the continuing proliferation of railroad companies, and duplicative facilities, fueled this concern. To an extent, the need to nationalize the system during the war was an example of this inefficiency. These concerns were the impetus for legislation to consider improvements to the system. The Esch-Cummins Act directed the ICC to prepare and adopt a plan for the consolidation of the railroad companies into a limited number of systems.

During the 1920s the railroad industry, with its rates and routes continuing to be set by the ICC, was facing increasing competition from other modes of transportation: trucking and airplanes. These competing modes were basically unregulated at the time; this competition was not acknowledged in the railroad legislation. The newer transport modes also received extensive financial assistance from government, such as in the construction of highways and rural roads, and the construction of airports. The competition contributed to the railroads' eventual decline in the 1920s and beyond, and which was amplified in the 1930s during the Great Depression. 

In 1929 the ICC published its proposed Complete Plan of Consolidation, also known as the "Ripley Plan," after its author, William Z. Ripley of Harvard University. The agency held hearings on the plan, but none of the proposed consolidations was ever implemented. Many small railroads failed during the Great Depression. Of those lines that survived, the stronger ones were not interested in supporting the weaker ones. In 1940 Congress formally abandoned the Ripley Plan.

Modern era (1946–present)

During the post-World War II boom many railroads were driven out of business due to competition from airlines and Interstate highways. The rise of the automobile led to the end of passenger train service on most railroads. Trucking businesses had become major competitors by the 1930s with the advent of improved paved roads, and after the war they expanded their operations as the Interstate highway network grew, and acquired increased market share of freight business. Railroads continued to carry bulk freight such as coal, steel and other commodities. However, the ICC continued to regulate railroad rates and other aspects of railroad operations, which limited railroads' flexibility in responding to changing market forces.

In 1966, Congress created the Federal Railroad Administration, to issue and enforce rail safety regulations, administer railroad assistance programs, and conduct research and development in support of improved railroad safety and national rail transportation policy. The safety functions were transferred from the ICC. The FRA was established as part of the new federal Department of Transportation.

Two of the largest remaining railroads, the Pennsylvania Railroad and the New York Central, merged in 1968 to form the Penn Central. At the insistence of the ICC the New York, New Haven and Hartford Railroad was added to the merger in 1969; in 1970 the Penn Central declared bankruptcy, the largest bankruptcy in U.S. history until then. Other bankrupt railroads included the Ann Arbor Railroad (1973), Erie Lackawanna Railway (1972), Lehigh Valley Railroad (1970), Reading Company (1971), Central Railroad of New Jersey (1967) and Lehigh and Hudson River Railway (1972).

In 1970 Congress created a government corporation, Amtrak, to take over operation of Penn Central passenger lines and selected inter-city passenger services from other private railroads, under the Rail Passenger Service Act. Amtrak began operations in 1971.

Congress passed the Regional Rail Reorganization Act of 1973 (sometimes called the "3R Act") to salvage viable freight operations from the bankrupt Penn Central and other lines in the northeast, mid-Atlantic and midwestern regions, through the creation of the Consolidated Rail Corporation (ConRail), a government-owned corporation. Conrail began operations in 1976. The 3R Act also formed the United States Railway Association, another government corporation, taking over the powers of the ICC with respect to allowing the bankrupt railroads to abandon unprofitable lines.

Amtrak acquired most of the right-of-way and facilities of the Penn Central Northeast Corridor from Washington, D.C. to Boston, under the Railroad Revitalization and Regulatory Reform Act (the "4R Act") of 1976.

In addition to freight railroads, Conrail inherited commuter rail operations from several predecessor railroads in the northeast, and these operations continued to be unprofitable. State and local government transportation agencies took over the passenger operations and acquired the various rights-of-way from Conrail in 1983, pursuant to the Northeast Rail Service Act of 1981. To replace the loss of commuter passenger rail service outside of the northeast region, state and local agencies established their own commuter systems in several metropolitan areas, generally by leasing rail lines from Amtrak or freight railroads.

The National Association of Railroad Passengers, a non-profit advocacy group, was organized in the late 1960s to support the operation of passenger trains.

Beginning in the late 1970s Amtrak eliminated several of its lightly traveled lines. Ridership stagnated at roughly 20 million passengers per year amid uncertain government aid from 1981 to about 2000. Ridership increased during the first decade of the 21st century after implementation of capital improvements in the Northeast Corridor and rises in automobile fuel costs.

In 1980 Congress enacted the Staggers Rail Act to revive freight traffic, by removing restrictive regulations and enabling railroads to be more competitive with the trucking industry. The Northeast Rail Service Act of 1981 authorized additional deregulation of northeast railroads. Among other things, these laws reduced the role of the ICC in regulating the railroads and allowed the carriers to discontinue unprofitable routes. More railroad companies merged and consolidated their lines in order to remain successful. These changes led to the current system of fewer, but profitable, Class I railroads covering larger regions of the United States.

Since the beginning of the current deregulatory era, the following Class I railroads have been involved in mergers:
 Union Pacific acquired the Missouri Pacific and Missouri–Kansas–Texas Railroad in the 1980s, the Chicago and North Western in 1995, and the Southern Pacific in 1996
 CSX was formed in 1986 from the Chessie System and the Seaboard System
 BNSF Railway was formed in 1996 from the Atchison, Topeka and Santa Fe (the "Santa Fe") and Burlington Northern
 Norfolk Southern was formed in 1982 from the Norfolk and Western and Southern Railway
 Canadian Pacific acquired the Delaware and Hudson in 1991
 Canadian National acquired the Illinois Central in 1999
 CSX and Norfolk Southern acquired most of the Conrail freight rail assets in 1997.

In 1995, when most of the ICC's powers had been eliminated, Congress finally abolished the agency and transferred its remaining functions to a new agency, the Surface Transportation Board.

21st century
In the early 21st century, several of the railroads, along with the federal government and various port agencies, began to reinvest in freight rail infrastructure, such as intermodal terminals and bridge and tunnel improvements. These projects are designed to increase capacity and efficiency across the national rail network. Two examples are the Heartland Corridor and the National Gateway.

Both the Bill Clinton and Barack Obama administrations had announced plans for new high-speed rail lines in their first terms. In the case of Clinton era, the only tangible outcome was the introduction of Amtrak's Acela Express, serving the Northeast Corridor, in 2000. Obama even mentioned his rail plans in his State of the Union address, the first time in decades a President had done so. While several small scale improvements to rail lines were financed by federal money, more ambitious plans in Florida, Ohio and other states failed when newly elected Republican governors stopped existing high-speed rail plans and returned federal funding.

In 2015 construction began on the California High-Speed Rail line. The Phase I portion, which would link Los Angeles and San Francisco in under three hours, was originally projected to be completed in 2029 at a cost of $40 billion. By 2018 however, the project experienced numerous delays and cost miscalculations, with an estimated completion date of 2033 and a cost of $98.1 billion.

Technology

The B&O established its Mount Clare Shops in Baltimore in 1829. This was the first railroad manufacturing facility in the U.S., and the company built locomotives, railroad cars, iron bridges and other equipment there. Following the B&O example, U.S. railroad companies soon became self-sufficient, as thousands of domestic machine shops turned out products and thousands of inventors and tinkerers improved the equipment.

Rail manufacturing
In general, U.S. railroad companies imported technology from Britain in the 1830s, particularly strap iron rails, as there were no rail manufacturing facilities in the United States at that time. Heavy iron "T" rails were first manufactured in the U.S. in the mid-1840s at Mount Savage, Maryland and Danville, Pennsylvania. This improved rail design permitted higher train speeds and more reliable operation. Discovery of high-quality iron ores in the mid-19th century, particularly in the Great Lakes region, led to the fabrication of better-quality rails.

Steel rails began to replace iron later in the 19th century. Several railroads imported steel rails from England in the 1860s, and the first commercially available steel rails in the U.S. were manufactured in 1867 at the Cambria Iron Works in Johnstown, Pennsylvania. By the mid-1880s U.S. railroads were using more steel rails than iron in building new or replacement tracks.

Track gauge

Through the 1830s, 1840s, and 1850s, not only local projects, but long-distance links, were completed, so that by 1860 the eastern half of the continent, especially the Northeast, was linked by a network of connecting railroads. In addition, the Erie Railway was built to  broad gauge, and in the 1870s a widespread movement looked at the cheaper  narrow gauge.

The Pacific Railway Act of 1863 established the standard gauge for the first transcontinental railroad. Except for the narrow gauge, gauges were standardized across North America after the end of the Civil War in 1865.

Locomotives

In the early years American railroads imported many steam locomotives from England. While the B&O and the PRR built many of their own steam locomotives, other railroads purchased from independent American manufacturers. Prominent among the early steam manufacturers were Norris, Baldwin and Rogers, followed by Lima and Alco later in the 19th and 20th centuries.

Diesel locomotives were first developed in Europe after World War I, and U.S. railroads began to use them widely in the 1930s and 1940s. Most U.S. roads discontinued use of steam locomotives by the 1950s. A diesel engine was expensive to build, but was less complex and easier to maintain than a steam locomotive, and required only one person to operate. This meant reduced costs and greater reliability for the railroads. Several companies developed fast streamliner trains, such as the Super Chief and the California Zephyr during the 1930s and 1940s. Their locomotives used either diesel or similar internal combustion engine designs. See Dieselisation in North America.

Though electric railways expanded in Europe, they never reached the same popularity in North America. They were built primarily in the north-west and the north-east beginning in the late 19th century. While some railroads used electric locomotives for both freight and passenger trains, by the end of the 20th century most freight trains were pulled only by diesel locomotives. The Northeast Corridor, the most heavily traveled passenger line in the US, is one of few long lines currently operating with electrification. See Railroad electrification in the United States.

Signalling and communications

Early forms of American railroad signaling and communication were virtually non-existent; the railroads initially managed their train operations using timetables.  However, there was no means of timely communication between engineers and dispatchers, and occasionally two trains inadvertently would be sent on a collision course, or "cornfield meet." With the advent of the telegraph in the 1840s, more-sophisticated systems were developed that allowed the dissemination of alterations to the timetable, known as train orders. These orders temporarily overrode the timetable, allowing the rescheduling and cancellation or addition of trains. The earliest recorded use of train orders was by the Erie Railroad in 1851.

The development of the electrical track circuit in the 1870s led to the use of systems of block signals, which improved the railroads' safety, speed and efficiency. Mechanical interlockings, which prevented conflicting movements at rail junctions and crossings, were also introduced in the U.S. in the 1870s, after their initial development in Britain. By the mid-20th century railroads had begun replacing mechanical interlockings with electronic interlocking systems.

Labor relations and worker safety
Railways changed employment practices in many ways. Lines with hundreds or thousands of employees developed systematic rules and procedures, not only for running the equipment but in hiring, promoting, paying and supervising employees. The railway system of management was adopted by all major business sectors. Railways offered a new type of work experience in enterprises vastly larger in size, complexity and management. At first workers were recruited from occupations where skills were roughly analogous and transferable, that is, workshop mechanics from the iron, machine and building trades; conductors from stagecoach drivers, steamship stewards and mail boat captains; station masters from commerce and commission agencies; and clerks from government offices.

In response to the strikes of the 1870s and 1880s, Congress passed the Arbitration Act of 1888, which authorized the creation of arbitration panels with the power to investigate the causes of labor disputes and to issue non-binding arbitration awards. The Act was a complete failure: only one panel was ever convened under the Act, and that one, in the case of the 1894 Pullman Strike, issued its report only after the strike had been crushed by a federal court injunction backed by federal troops.

Congress attempted to correct these shortcomings in the Erdman Act, passed in 1898. This law likewise provided for voluntary arbitration, but made any award issued by the panel binding and enforceable in federal court. It also outlawed discrimination against employees for union activities, prohibited "yellow dog" contracts (employee agrees not to join a union while employed), and required both sides to maintain the status quo during any arbitration proceedings and for three months after an award was issued. The arbitration procedures were rarely used. A successor statute, the Newlands Labor Act, was passed in 1913 and proved more effective, but was largely superseded when the federal government nationalized the railroads in 1917.

As railroads expanded after the Civil War, so too did the rate of accidents among railroad personnel, especially brakemen. Many accidents were associated with the coupling and uncoupling of railroad cars, and the operation of manually operated brakes (hand brakes). The rise in accidents led to calls for safety legislation, as early as the 1870s. In the 1880s, the number of on-the-job fatalities of railroad workers was second only to those of coal miners. Through that decade, several state legislatures enacted safety laws. However, the specific requirements varied among the states, making implementation difficult for interstate rail carriers, and Congress passed the Safety Appliance Act in 1893 to provide a uniform standard. The law required railroads to install air brakes and automatic couplers on all trains, and led to a sharp drop in accidents.

The Esch–Cummins Act of 1920 terminated the nationalization program and created a Railway Labor Board (RLB) to regulate wages and issue non-binding proposals to settle disputes. In 1921 the RLB ordered a twelve percent reduction in employees' wages, which led to the Great Railroad Strike of 1922, involving rail shop workers nationwide, followed by a court injunction to end the strike. Congress passed the Railway Labor Act of 1926 to rectify the shortcomings of the RLB procedures.

Congress added railroad worker safety laws throughout the 20th century. Significant among this legislation is the Federal Railroad Safety Act of 1970, which gave the FRA broad responsibilities over all aspects of rail safety, and expanded the agency's authority to cover all railroads, both interstate and intrastate.

Impact on American economy and society
According to historian Henry Adams the system of railroads needed:
the energies of a generation, for it required all the new machinery to be created—capital, banks, mines, furnaces, shops, power-houses, technical knowledge, mechanical population, together with a steady remodelling of social and political habits, ideas, and institutions to fit the new scale and suit the new conditions. The generation between 1865 and 1895 was already mortgaged to the railways, and no one knew it better than the generation itself. The impact can be examined through five aspects: shipping, finance, management, careers, and popular reaction.

Shipping freight and passengers
First they provided a highly efficient network for shipping freight and passengers across a large national market. The result was a transforming impact on most sectors of the economy including manufacturing, retail and wholesale, agriculture and finance. Supplemented with the Telegraph that added rapid communications, the United States now had an integrated national market practically the size of Europe, with no internal barriers or tariffs, all supported by a common language, and financial system and a common legal system. The railroads at first supplemented, then largely replaced the previous transportation modes of turnpikes and canals, rivers and intracoastal ocean traffic. Highly efficient Northern railroads played a major role in winning the Civil War, while the overburdened Southern lines collapsed in the face of an insurmountable challenge.  In the late 19th century pipelines were built for the oil trade, and in the 20th century trucking and aviation emerged.

Basis of the private financial system
Railroads financing provided the basis of the private (non-governmental) financial system. Construction of railroads was far more expensive than factories or canals. A new steamboat on the Hudson, Mississippi, Missouri, or Ohio rivers cost about the same as one mile of track.

In 1860, the combined total of railroad stocks and bonds was $1.8 billion; 1897 it reached $10.6 billion (compared to a total national debt of $1.2 billion).
Funding came from financiers throughout the Northeast, and from Europe, especially Britain. The federal government provided no cash to any other railroads. However it did provide unoccupied free land to some of the Western railroads, so they could sell it to farmers and have customers along the route.  Some cash came from states, or from local governments that use money as a leverage to prevent being bypassed by the main line. The larger sound came from the southern states during the Reconstruction era, as they try to rebuild their destroyed rail system. Some states such as Maine and Texas also made land grants to local railroads; the state total was 49 million acres. The emerging American financial system was based on railroad bonds. Boston was the first center, but New York by 1860 was the dominant financial market. The British invested heavily in railroads around the world, but nowhere more so than the United States; The total came to about $3 billion by 1914. In 1914–1917, they liquidated their American assets to pay for war supplies.

Inventing modern management
The third dimension was in designing complex managerial systems that could handle far more complicated simultaneous relationships that could be dreamed of by the local factory owner who could patrol every part of his own factory in a matter of hours. Civil engineers became the senior management of railroads. The leading innovators were the Western Railroad of Massachusetts and the Baltimore and Ohio Railroad in the 1840s, the Erie in the 1850s and the Pennsylvania in the 1860s.

After a serious accident, the Western Railroad of Massachusetts put in place a system of responsibility for district managers and dispatchers to keep track of all train movements. Discipline was essential—everyone had to follow the rules exactly to prevent accidents. Decision-making powers had to be distributed to ensure safety and to juggle the complexity of numerous trains running in both directions on a single track, keeping to schedules that could easily be disrupted by weather mechanical breakdowns, washouts or hitting a wandering cow. As the lines grew longer with more and more business originating at dozens of different stations, the Baltimore and Ohio set up more complex system that separated finances from daily operations.  The Erie Railroad, faced with growing competition, had to make lower bids for freight movement, and had to know on a daily basis how much each train was costing them. Statistics was the weapon of choice. By the 1860s, the Pennsylvania Railroad—the largest in the world—was making further advances in using bureaucracy under John Edgar Thomson, president 1852–1874. He divided the system into several geographical divisions, which each reported daily to a general superintendent in Philadelphia. All the American railroads copied each other in the new managerial advances, and by the 1870s emerging big businesses in the industrial field likewise copied the railroad model.

Career paths
The fourth dimension was in management of the workforce, both blue-collar workers and white-collar workers. Railroading became a career in which young men entered at about age 18 to 20, and spent their entire lives usually with the same line. Young men could start working on the tracks, become a fireman, and work his way up to the engineer. The mechanical world of the roundhouses have their own career tracks. A typical career path would see a young man hired at age 18 as a shop laborer, be promoted to skilled mechanic at age 24, brakeman at 25, freight conductor at 27, and passenger conductor at age 57.  Women were not hired.

White-collar careers paths likewise were delineated. Educated young men started in clerical or statistical work and moved up to station agents or bureaucrats at the divisional or central headquarters.  At each level, they had more and more knowledge experience and human capital. They were very hard to replace, and were virtually guaranteed permanent jobs and provided with insurance and medical care.  Hiring, firing and wage rates were set not by the foreman, but by central administrators, in order to minimize favoritism and personality conflicts. Everything was by the book, and increasingly complex set of rules told everyone exactly what they should do it every circumstance, and exactly what their rank and pay would be.  Young men who were first hired in the 1840s and 1850s retired from the same railroad 40 or 50 years later. To discourage them from leaving for another company, they were promised pensions when they retired. Indeed, the railroads invented the American pension system.

Early attitudes towards railroads
Boosters in every city worked feverishly to make sure the railroad came through, knowing their urban dreams depended upon it. The mechanical size, scope and efficiency of the railroads made a profound impression; people would dress in their Sunday best to go down to the terminal to watch the train come in. David Nye argues that:
The startling introduction of railroads into this agricultural society provoked a discussion that soon arrived at the enthusiastic consensus that railways were sublime and that they would help to unify, dignify, expand and enrich the nation. They became part of the public celebrations of Republicanism. The rhetoric, the form, and the central figures of civic ceremonies changed to accommodate the intrusion of this technology... [Between 1828 and 1869] Americans integrated the railroad into the national economy and enfolded it within the sublime.

Travel became much easier, cheaper and more common. Shoppers from small towns could make day trips to big city stores.  Hotels, resorts and tourist attractions were built to accommodate the demand. The realization that anyone could buy a ticket for a thousand-mile trip was empowering.  Historians Gary Cross and Rick Szostak argue:
 with the freedom to travel came a greater sense of national identity and a reduction in regional cultural diversity. Farm children could more easily acquaint themselves with the big city, and easterners could readily visit the West. It is hard to imagine the United States of continental proportions without the railroad.

The engineers became model citizens, bringing their can-do spirit and their systematic work effort to all phases of the economy as well as local and national government. By 1910, major cities were building magnificent palatial railroad stations, such as the Pennsylvania Station in New York City, and the Union Station in Washington DC.

As early as the 1830s, novelists and poets began fretting that the railroads would destroy the rustic attractions of the American landscape. By the 1840s concerns were rising about terrible accidents when speeding trains crashed into helpless wooden carriages. By the 1870s, railroads were vilified by Western farmers who absorbed the Granger movement theme that monopolistic carriers controlled too much pricing power, and that the state legislatures had to impose maximum prices. Local merchants and shippers supported the demand and got some "Granger Laws" passed. Anti-railroad complaints were loudly repeated  in late 19th century political rhetoric. The idea of establishing a strong rate fixing federal body was achieved during the Progressive Era, primarily by a coalition of shipping interests. Railroad historians mark the 1906 Hepburn Act that gave the ICC the power to set maximum railroad rates as a damaging blow to the long-term profitability and growth of railroads. After 1910 the lines faced an emerging trucking industry to compete with for freight, and automobiles and buses to compete for passenger service.

Environmental history of railways 
Railways also disrupted the natural tendencies of the environment through an increased capacity for transportation. Railroads throughout the United States allowed quicker, more efficient transport of goods and people that were previously unavailable. Agriculture, animals, soldiers, goods, and natural resources were now able to move large distances in much shorter amounts of time. As a result, things that were not harvested before like certain tracts of arable land or animal populations were now being used.

Impact on buffalo population 

During the first half of the 19th century, herds of buffalo were plentiful throughout the Midwestern states of America, but the American people through Manifest Destiny drastically changed the American landscape. Before the Civil War, 8 million buffalo roamed free, but only 4–6 million remained after the war because their hides had become valuable throughout the country and domestic horses and cattle had begun to occupy the same space and graze the same land as the bison. William Hornaday, an influential zoologist and student of the American bison, wrote, "as soon as the railways crossed the buffalo country, the slaughter began." Railroads gave rise to the consumption of buffalo because hunters and businessmen could transport parts of the buffalo to distant parts of the country where demand was high. Before, it was not plausible to commercialize the buffalo because the hide, meat, and bones since it would take so much longer to get to their destination. Since railroads made transportation much quicker, it was now plausible for people to make money off the seemingly endless resource in the plains of the Midwest: the buffalo. So extreme was the mass hunting of buffalo thanks to the new railroads that wolves could not consume all of the carcasses that were left behind.

As a result of the rapidly declining bison population, economic opportunities arose through the creation of jobs. Men acquired jobs hunting and skinning bison on the plains, as well as maintaining railroad infrastructure used to transport the valuable bison hides.

Railroads in popular culture 
The aggressive operation of a locomotive at the imaginary “Pile-up station” by fictional engineer “Joe Smashup” formed the basis of a satire that appeared in US newspapers in and around the year 1855.

In 1967 Gordon Lightfoot, a Canadian folk singer released a song called, "Canadian Railroad Trilogy" which documents the way he sees nature and how nature has changed because of increasing railways going through North America. He describes the pristine wilderness "long before the white man and long before the wheel" and before pioneers started to build mines, mills, and factories in the verdant land. Because of the optimism for wealth and adventure, Lightfoot claims, "The railroad men grew restless for to hear the hammers ring." He also describes the cost this industry had on nature by penning the line, "Open her heart let the lifeblood flow." He describes nature's heart as being bled by the workers' dreams, which could not be stopped, "Into the muskeg and into the rain." Because man wants to be in control of nature and conquer it, he wants to be able to say,

"On the mountain tops we stand

All the world at our command

We have opened up the soil

With our teardrops and our toil"

Through hard work technology, pioneers and businessmen adapted the environment for their own commercial needs and quest for power.

Historiography
There is no question about the importance of railroads in American history.  Churella finds that back in the 1950s business and economic historians, led by Alfred D. Chandler, Jr. and Robert Fogel, made railroads the centerpiece of advanced historiography.  That era has passed as graduate programs have faded away, courses on railroad history do not make the curriculum, and the historiography has shifted away from professional historian to the "railfans"—very well informed amateur writers fascinated by the memorabilia, technology and locomotives of the steam era. Looking at the voluminous output of railfan authors, Klein says:

"The vast bulk of this work is devoted to minute descriptions of power, rolling stock, obscure short lines, and technical subjects....  But few address the larger questions of railroad history or place their topic in broader contexts."

The result is a multiplicity of histories of specific railroads, large and small. Typically they deal with standard topics: the builders and their organizational, legislative and financial dealings; colorful construction crews laying down wood ties and steel rail; the development of locomotives and passenger cars; boosters who sought a stop in their little town else it would die; the 1880–1920 golden age of the passenger long-distance travel and local excursions; the steady erosion of passenger service during the automobile age; the freight agent and the small-town depot. They end with the more recent saga of retrenchment, merger, and abandonment. Klein, Churella, Roth, and Franham all find that the popular writers show little interest in the development of managerial and organizational complexity of the sort that Chandler studied, or the economic impact that concerned Fogel's cohort. From outside the field of railroad history, academic labor historians now deal with the culture of the workers, strikes, the careers for blue collar and white collar men, and racial discrimination. Academic political historians deal with the Granger, Populist and Progressive attacks, and in federal or state regulation.

Railroad active mileage by region
Source: United States Census Bureau, Report on Transportation Business in the United States at the Eleventh Census 1890, pg. 4.

See also
 American business history
 Confederate railroads in the American Civil War
 High-speed rail in the United States
 History of rail transport in Canada
 History of rapid transit#North America
 History of the Union Pacific Railroad
 Oldest railroads in North America
 Rail transport in Mexico#History
 Rail transportation in the United States
 Railroad brotherhoods
 List of American railway unions
 Great Railroad Strike of 1877
 Great Southwest railroad strike of 1886
 Great Railroad Strike of 1922
 1992 United States railroad strike
 Railroads in New England
 Timeline of United States railway history
 Track gauge in the United States

References

Further reading

Reference books
 Bryant, Keith L., ed. Railroads in the Age of Regulation, 1900–1980 (1988); part of Encyclopedia of American business history and biography; 500+ pages each with coverage of entrepreneurs, corporations, and technologies, Plus specialized bibliographies
 Frey, Robert L., ed. Railroads in the Nineteenth Century (1988); part of Encyclopedia of American business history and biography; 500+ Pages each with coverage of entrepreneurs, corporations, and technologies, Plus specialized bibliographies
 Hayes, Derek. Historical atlas of the North American railroad (2010); 400 historical maps
 Hubbard, Freeman H. (1981). Encyclopedia of North American railroading: 150 years of railroading in the United States and Canada. (New York: McGraw-Hill). .
 Nock, O.S., ed. Encyclopedia of Railways (London, 1977), worldwide coverage, heavily illustrated
 Riley, C. J. The Encyclopedia of Trains & Locomotives (2002)
 Stover, John. The Routledge historical atlas of the American railroads (1999) online

Scholarly studies 
 Callen, Zachary. Railroads and American Political Development: Infrastructure, Federalism, and State Building (UP of Kansas, 2016) xii, 257 pp.
 Chandler, Alfred D., ed. The Railroads: The Nation's First Big Business – Sources and Readings. (1981). 
 Chandler, Alfred D.  The Visible Hand: The Managerial Revolution in American Business.  (1977).
  
 Deverell, William (1994). Railroad Crossing: Californians and the Railroad, 1850–1910. (Berkeley, CA: University of California Press). .
 Ducker, James H. (1982). Men of the steel rails: Workers on the Atchison, Topeka & Santa Fe Railroad, 1869–1900.

 Grant, H. Roger. Railroads and the American People (2012)  excerpt and text search
 Jenks, Leland H. (1944). "Railroads as an Economic Force in American Development," The Journal of Economic History, Vol. 4, No. 1 (May, 1944), 1–20. .
 Kirkland, Edward Chase (1948). Men, Cities and Transportation, A Study of New England History 1820–1900. (2 vol.) Harvard University Press.
 Klein, Maury (1997). The Life and Legend of Jay Gould Johns Hopkins University Press. .
 Klein, Maury (2000). The Life & Legend of E. H. Harriman (2000) University of North Carolina Press. . Online edition.
 Marrs, Aaron W. Railroads in the Old South: Pursuing Progress in a Slave Society (2009) excerpt and text search
 Martin, Albro. James J. Hill and the Opening of the Northwest (1990) excerpt and text search
 Martin, Albro. Railroads Triumphant: The Growth, Rejection, and Rebirth of a Vital American Force (1992) excerpt and text search; wide-ranging overview
 Meyer, B.H. and Caroline E. MacGill. History of Transportation in the United States before 1860 (1917). pp 366–72 online; 698pp; Encyclopedic coverage; railroads by state pp 319–550;  Google edition
 Middleton, William D. ed. (2007). Encyclopedia of North American Railroads. Indiana University Press. .
 Miner, Craig. A Most Magnificent Machine: America Adopts the Railroad, 1825–1862  (University Press of Kansas; 2010) 325 pages; Documents the enthusiasm that accompanied the advent of the railroad system
  Nice, David C.  Amtrak: The History and Politics of a National Railroad (1998) online edition
 Lamb, J. Parker. "A Macro-scale Look at Railroad History." Railroad History (Fall/Winter 2012), Issue 207, pp 78–89. 
 Riegel, Robert Edgar. The Story of the Western Railroads (1926) online edition
 Saunders, Richard. Main lines: Rebirth of the North American railroads, 1970–2002 (Northern Illinois University Press, 2003).
 Stover, John. History of the Illinois Central Railroad (1975)
 Stover, John. Iron Road to the West: American Railroads in the 1850s (1978) online
 Stover, John. The Routledge historical atlas of the American railroads (1999) online
 Ward,  James Arthur. J. Edgar Thomson: Master of the Pennsylvania (1980) 265 pages
 Ward, James A. "Power and Accountability on the Pennsylvania Railroad, 1846–1878." Business History Review 1975 49(1): 37–59. in JSTOR
 White, Richard. Railroaded: The Transcontinentals and the Making of Modern America (2011) excerpt and text search
 Wolmar, Christian. The Great Railroad Revolution: The History of Trains in America (2012), survey to 2012; emphasis on 19th century; 448pp  excerpt and text search

Civil War
 Bacon, Benjamin (1997) Sinews of War: How Technology, Industry and Transportation Won the Civil War. Novato: Presidio Press. .
 Bailey, Joe R. "Union Lifeline in Tennessee: A Military History of the Nashville and Northwestern Railroad," Tennessee Historical Quarterly (2008) 67#2 pp. 106–123 in JSTOR
 Black III, Robert C. "Railroads in the Confederacy." Civil War History (1961) 7#3 pp: 231–238. online
 Black, III, Robert C. The Railroads of the Confederacy (1952)  excerpt and text search
 Clark, John Elwood. Railroads in the Civil War: The Impact of Management on Victory and Defeat (LSU Press, 2001)
 Cotterill, R. S. "The Louisville and Nashville Railroad 1861–1865," American Historical Review (1924) 29#4 pp. 700–715 in JSTOR
 Fish, Carl Russell. "The Northern Railroads, April, 1861," The American Historical Review, 22#4 (1917), pp. 778–793 ; old but still valuable
 Fite, Emerson David. Social and industrial conditions in the North during the Civil War (1910) online edition, old but still quite useful
 Gabel, Christopher R. (1977) Railroad Generalship: Foundations of Civil War Strategy. US Army Command and General Staff College, Fort Leavenworth, KS. Combat Studies Institute. 
 
 Gordon, Ralph C. "Hospital Trains of the Army of the Cumberland." Tennessee Historical Quarterly 51.3 (1992): 147+
 Lash, Jeffrey N. "Joseph E. Johnston and the Virginia Railways, 1861–62." Civil War History 35.1 (1989): 5–27. online
 Lash, Jeffrey N. Destroyer of the Iron Horse: General Joseph E. Johnston and Confederate Rail Transport. 1861–65 (1991).
 Leignadier, Victoria A. "Railroads in the Civil War: A Strategic Perspective' (Army War College 2001) online.
 Lord, Francis Alfred. Lincoln's railroad man: Herman Haupt (1969).
 Hodges, Robert R. Jr. (2009) American Civil War Railroad Tactics. Oxford, UK: Osprey Publishing. .
 McGuire, Peter S. "The Railroads of Georgia, 1860–1880." The Georgia Historical Quarterly (1932): 179–213. in JSTOR
 Pickenpaugh, Roger.  Rescue by Rail: Troop Transfer and the Civil War in the West, 1863 (1998)
 Ramsdell, Charles W. "The Confederate Government and the Railroads" The American Historical Review (1917) 22#4  in JSTOR
 Riegel, R.E. "Federal Operation of Southern Railroads during the Civil War." Mississippi Valley Historical Review (1922) 9#2 in JSTOR
 Summers, Festus P.  Baltimore and Ohio in the Civil War. (1939). .
 Sutton, Robert M. The Illinois Central Railroad in peace and war, 1858–1868 (1948).
 Turner, George E.  Victory Rode the Rails: The Strategic Place of the Railroads in the Civil War (1953), an often-cited survey
 Weber, Thomas. The Northern Railroads in the Civil War, 1861–1865 (1999) online

Old studies
 Clarke, Thomas Curtis (1889). The American Railway: Its Construction, Development, Management, and Appliances (New York: Charles Scribner's Sons). 456 pp.  online
 Davis, John Patterson (1894).  Union Pacific Railway: A Study in Railway Politics, History, and Economics. (Chicago: S. C. Griggs and Company). 247 pp.  online
 Dozier, Howard Douglas (1920). A History of the Atlantic Coast Line Railroad. (New York: Houghton Mifflin). 197 pp.
 Flint, Henry M. (1868) Railroads of the United States: Their History and Statistics. (Philadelphia. PA: John E. Potter Co.) 452 pp.
 Johnson, Emory Richard (1908). American Railway Transportation. 2nd rev. ed. (New York: D. Appleton & Co.) 434 pp.
 Moody, John. The Railroad Builders: A Chronicle of the Welding of the States (1919) online edition; popular history
 Raper, Charles Lee. and Arthur Twining Hadley. Railway Transportation: A History of Its Economics and of Its Relation to the State, (1912) 331 pages;  complete online at Google

Historiography
 Churella, Albert J. "Company, State, and Region: Three Approaches to Railroad History," Enterprise & Society (2006) 7#3, pp. 581–591
 Klein, Maury. "The Unfinished Business: of American Railroad History," in Klein, Unfinished Business: The Railroad in American Life (1994) pp 166–86

Video
 Railroads in U.S. History (1830–2010) (2010), set of 4 DVDs, directed by Ron Meyer; #1, "Railroads come to America (1830–1840);" #2, "The First Great Railroad Boom (1841– 1860)"; #3, "A New Era in American Railroading (1861–1870)," #4, "The Second Great Railroad Boom (1871–2010)" further information

External links
  Railroad History Bibliography by Richard Jensen, Montana State University
 Primary sources on 19th century and early 20th century American railways – DigitalBookIndex.com
 Booknotes interview with Sarah Gordon on Passage to Union: How the Railroads Transformed American Life, 1829–1929, March 9, 1997.
 Railroad History, An Overview Of The Past

 
United States
History of the United States by topic